In cryptography, TSC-3 is a stream cypher algorithm developed by Jin Hong, Dong Hoon Lee, Yongjin Yeom, Daewan Han, and Seongtaek Chee. It has been submitted to the eSTREAM Project of the eCRYPT network.

Stream ciphers